WDBF may refer to:

 WDBF-FM, a radio station (106.3 FM) licensed to serve Mount Union, Pennsylvania, United States
 WDBF-LP, a low-power radio station (103.5 FM) licensed to serve Decatur, Indiana, United States
 World Dodgeball Federation, the world governing body for the sport of dodgeball.